The 2018–19 season was Arsenal Women's Football Club's 33rd season of competitive football. The club participated in the Women's Super League, the FA Cup and the League Cup. This was the first full season of the club under Australian coach Joe Montemurro.

The club qualified for the Champions League by securing a top two spot in the league with three games to go. In the penultimate game of the season, Arsenal secured the top spot of the league and was English champions once more after a seven-year wait. The Gunners finished runners-up in the League Cup and lost in the fifth round of the FA Cup.

Review

Pre Season
Before the first friendlies in pre-season, the squad saw some changes. Midfielders Viktoria Schnaderbeck, Lia Wälti, defender Tabea Kemme (coming from the German Bundesliga) and goalkeeper Pauline Peyraud-Magnin (from the French Division 1) joined the squad, while Arsenal legend Alex Scott retired to focus on her media career, Heather O'Reilly moved back to the States and Anna Moorhouse and Lauren James switched to different English clubs.

The pre-season friendlies consisted of the 5–0 won homegame against Italian Serie A champions Juventus on 5 August, in which Vivianne Miedema scored four goals – Kim Little scored the other one. Arsenal participated in the Toulouse International Ladies Cup in France, where it competed against Montpellier HSC (won 2–1 with goals from Miedema and Daniëlle van de Donk) and Paris Saint-Germain (2–2 draw, with a goal from Beth Mead and a last-minute penalty by Little). The tournament was won by Arsenal, ahead of the aforementioned teams and Bayern Munich (who Arsenal didn't play).

August
After the friendlies, the only game in August was the League Cup tie against West Ham United. The game was won 3–1, with two goals from McCabe and one from Emma Mitchell. It also was the first appearance of Lia Wälti in a competitive match for Arsenal.

September
September saw the club play four games, three for the league and one for the League Cup. Arsenal got off to a great start in the league, by firing five past Liverpool in their 5–0 match on 9 September (home). Miedema scored her first hattrick of the season and a goal a piece for Lisa Evans and Little. Liverpool was unable to score in the goal behind Pauline Peyraud-Magnin who made her first appearance in the Arsenal shirt. The subsequent League Cup tie against Championship club Lewes on the 16th displayed the big class difference, Arsenal scored nine goals, with hattricks by Miedema and Little, with Van de Donk, McCabe and Evans each adding another goal to the scoreline, Lewes was unable to get a goal in leaving the score at 0–9. The thumping didn't stop there, Yeovil Town saw seven goals ending in the back of their net on 19 September (away), with Jordan Nobbs scoring a brace and Mead, McCabe, Miedema, Dominique Bloodworth and Little all scoring a goal. The team who held them to a season-defining 0–0 draw in the previous season was unable to respond to this firepower, ending the game in 0–7.

Greatest opposition came from West Ham United on the 23rd (home), who were able to go ahead on two occasions via goals by Kate Longhurst in a game that saw some sloppy defending and goalkeeping. A hattrick from Van de Donk and a goal from Little saw them come back, before Claire Rafferty scored from a free-kick leaving it up to Arsenal to keep the one goal advantage in the last few minutes of the game. The Gunners succeeded in that, the game ended in a 4–3 win.

October
After escaping from West Ham, Arsenal came up on 14 October against the champions from the previous season, Chelsea in a highly anticipated game (away). After a nervy first 20 minutes, Arsenal got the overhand when Little scored from the spot after a challenge from Adelina Engman on Mitchell inside the box. Before half-time, Miedema scored the second. Three more goals would come after half-time, Nobbs scored a fabulous cross-turned-goal, Miedema scored the fourth out of a rebound from an attempt by Mead and Nobbs got played in perfectly for the fifth. 0–5, a big result for the Gunners, stating their title ambitions in a very clear way. Many positives, but also a big downside: in the second half a tackle from Drew Spence brought down the influential midfielder Little who was unable to continue and was later diagnosed with a broken leg, which will keep her off the pitch for up to 10 weeks. Spence got away with just a yellow card for this offence.

On the subsequent Sundays, Arsenal won both matches against Reading (6–0 at home, 21 October) and Bristol City (0–4 away, 28th). The Reading game saw another hattrick from Miedema, her third of the season (second in the league) and goals from Nobbs, Mead and Van de Donk. Bristol City saw four goals end up in their net, with Miedema scoring twice and Nobbs and Van de Donk claiming the other two goals. Bristol made it hard on Arsenal and the scoreline did not fully reflect the game, with two late goals (88' and 90') taking the score up to four, which did not seem fully deserved. Sophie Baggaley (Bristol goalkeeper) played a good game and held a lot of good shots. The two goals took Miedema up to 11 goals in just 6 games, making her the topscorer and well surpassing her four goals from the entire 2017–2018 season.

November
Birmingham City visited the Gunners at home on 4 November for what was predicted as the next big test after the game against Chelsea. The game started evenly with both teams unable to score a goal in the first half. The second half saw Nobbs score the first goal of the evening, but Arsenal was caught sleeping in the aftermath: Birmingham instantly responded with their goal, just a minute later. Not much later, Evans got to ground in the penalty area after being held on to by a Birmingham defender. Van de Donk converted the subsequent spot-kick. In the dying moments of the match, Nobbs scored the third goal - ending the game in 3–1.

After the international break, Arsenal visited Everton, who are at the bottom of the league at this point. The first half frustrated the Gunners, as they had a lot of chances, but were unable to put them past the Everton goalkeeper. It was Van de Donk who was able to find the back of the net in the end of the first half. The second half saw a quick start, Nobbs scored the second before Miedema scored another two. A comfortable 0–4 win, but a big blow to the team when Nobbs went down with a few minutes to play and had to be stretchered off the pitch. Later it was confirmed that she had sustained an ACL injury, side-lining her for the rest of the season.

With both Little and Nobbs out of the squad, the team welcomed Brighton & Hove Albion on 25 November. The Gunners saw themselves go behind in the ninth minute when a defensive mix-up let through 
Iniabasi Umotong, slotting in her shot past Van Veenendaal. It took some time for the team to get up to steam, as they were saved a second goal against not much later. They then picked up the pace and saw the three Dutch players, Miedema, Bloodworth and Van de Donk all fire a goal past the Brighton goalkeeper in the first half. The second half saw a lone goal from Mead to finish the game on 4–1, extending their winning streak to 9 league games.

December
2 December saw the team travelling to Manchester to play second-placed Manchester City. The injuries clearly had hit hard on the team, with just nine fit senior outfield players, giving Paige Bailey-Gayle her first start for the team. It proved a frustrating afternoon for the Gunners, who saw Georgia Stanway fire two goals past Peyraud-Magnin, leaving Arsenal no chances. The 2–0 loss ended their winning run of 9 league games, but left them still on top of the league with three points clear.

After the league defeat against City, Arsenal played the two remaining games in the groupstage of the League Cup. The first one on 6 December saw them when 5–0 at home against Charlton Athletic, with both Miedema and McCabe scoring a brace, complemented by a Charlton own goal. A week later on the 12th, the Gunners traveled to Kent to play against the Millwall Lionesses. Millwall went ahead in the first half, in a match that saw three academy players in the starting eleven. In the second half, three Arsenal goals came in quick succession: first Miedema scored and a minute later Ruby Grant scored her first goal for the senior team. Williamson scored her first goal of the season some minutes later to get a comfortable 1–3 win.

The League Cup results secured the top spot in the group and advancement to the play-offs stage. Because of the 11-team league, Arsenal did not play in the league whilst the other teams did. City went level on points but Arsenal had a game in hand and a better goal difference.

Winter Transfer Window
During the winter transfer window, the club made signings to strengthen the squad: Danish defender Janni Arnth (from Linköpings FC) and midfielder Katrine Veje (from Montpellier HSC).

January
The first game of 2019 was on 6 January away at West Ham United. It saw a slow start from Arsenal, who went behind after a goal from Jane Ross. Williamson and Arnth both scored a header from a corner by Mead, making it the first league goal for Williamson this season and Arnth scoring on her debut in an Arsenal shirt. Ross leveled just before half time, but two goals from Van de Donk made sure the Gunners won the match 2–4. The match also saw the return of captain Little, after having suffered a broken leg in the match against Chelsea. Later that afternoon, title rivals Manchester City drew against Bristol City, giving Arsenal a two-point lead and a game in hand at the top of the league table.

In the midweek on the 10th, Arsenal welcomed Birmingham City for the quarter-final of the League Cup. There were obvious signs of fatigue following the match against West Ham in the weekend. The first half saw no goals, but a good penalty stop from Van Veenendaal to deny Birmingham the lead. In the second half, a defensive mix-up led to the 0–1 lead for the visitors. The game however saw a nail-biting ending, when Van de Donk scored from a Miedema cross with six minutes left on the clock. In stoppage time, Miedema turned from provider to scorer when she sent home the pass from McCabe to make sure the game was won 2–1 in the 90 minutes and sending the Gunners into the semi-final. The game saw the first appearance of winter signing Katrine Veje.

The last game before the January international break, on the 13th saw London rivals Chelsea come to Borehamwood. It would prove to be a hard match for the Gunners, with Erin Cuthbert scoring on both sides of half time to go 0–2 ahead. Miedema scored in the 80th minute to make 1–2. It would prove to make an exciting last ten minutes of the match, but in the end not enough to get a point out of the match. This meant that Manchester City would go top of the league and leave Arsenal in second place, one point behind City but with a game in hand.

After the international break, Arsenal visited Reading on the 27th in Adams Park with good memories from last season's Continental Cup final win there. The team came out of the gates blazing with Miedema scoring her 16th league goal of the season, surpassing the record set for most league goals in a season by Ellen White in the previous season. A controversially given penalty used by Little and a last minute goal by McCabe, assisted with the first touches of just subbed on academy player Melisa Filis ended the game in a 0–3 win. A win of fourth placed Birmingham City over third placed Chelsea might mean that the title could be decided between Arsenal and Manchester City, who are now 5 and 6 points clear of Birmingham City and Chelsea. The Gunners still have their game in hand over Manchester City, whilst just being one point down on them.

February
On the 3rd, Arsenal visited Crawley Wasps, a fourth tier team for the fourth round proper of the FA Cup. The game was played with an heavily rotated team, with six academy players in the game. It was Little who scored first, after which the academy player and just 16-year-old Grant scored a hat-trick to make the final score 0–4.

Continuing in the cups, the newly formed Manchester United visited the Gunners in Borehamwood in the semi-final of the WSL Cup on the 7th. The Championship side provided a good battle but it was Arsenal who struck first: Miedema scored on both sides of half-time to net her 24th and 25th goals of the season. United scored through Mollie Green in the 83rd minute leaving a nervy last 10 minutes. Although the game finished 2–1, the score suggests a more even tie than it was, Arsenal were clearly on top against the Championship side.

The injuries were not to be forgotten however and the Gunners were painfully reminded when they were outplayed by Chelsea away on the 17th. The two top three sides met for the fifth round of the FA Cup, in which Arsenal were unable to respond to the game played by Chelsea. Chelsea won the match 3–0 with a brace from Bethany England and a goal by Jonna Andersson, booting Arsenal out of the FA Cup.

The mid-week game (20 February) against Yeovil Town was supposed to be a routine win against bottom of the table, but the Gunners only found the back of the net in the second half. Two goals from Little (one of which a penalty) and a strike by Mead saw Arsenal win 3–0 leaving them still in contention for the league title with a two-point deficit on City but with two games in hand.

23 February saw the League Cup final against Manchester City at Bramall Lane. This third game in a week saw Arsenal topscorer Miedema starting from the bench due to tiredness. The game was fairly even, both teams had chances but none went in the back of the net. After the regular 90 minutes and the extra time, it all came down to penalties. The game and previous games had taken a toll on the players, with both Williamson (who had a very good game) and Van de Donk both missing their penalties. City won 2–4 in the end.

March
After the February/March international period, Arsenal returned to league action when they were visited by Bristol City on 14 March. The game saw a quick opening goal by Miedema in the 11th minute making the Gunners' intention clear. The team had to wait until the second half however to see the ball end in the back of the net again: two goals by Miedema and one by McCabe. These goals went unanswered by the Vixens, resulting in a convincing 4–0 victory. The three goals by Miedema was her fourth (third in the league) hat-trick of the season.

24 March saw Arsenal travel to Liverpool for their rescheduled match. Having won the reverse fixture 5–0 at the start of the season and Liverpool's recent poor form made the Gunners heavy favourites for the game. Little opened the scoring after 20 minutes before Mead found the back of the net two minutes later. The second half saw a further strike from Mead and one by Bloodworth (however classified as an own goal by Sophie Bradley-Auckland). Courtney Sweetman-Kirk got one back via a penalty when Veje brought down a Liverpool player inside the box. The game ended after a goal by Miedema, her 20th league goal of the season, in 1–5.

The last game before the April international break saw Arsenal go to Birmingham City in a bid to wrap up Champions League football for the next season. A win would see them secure second place in the league, which means qualification. Arsenal started the first half well and had several opportunities to go ahead but was unable to find a way past Hannah Hampton who had a very good game keeping for the Blues. Birmingham had a few chances on goal as well, notably Ellen White requiring a diving save from Peyraud-Magnin. The second half started with much of the same: Arsenal had the upperhand but got sloppier and were unable to keep possession for very long. Of all the moments in the match, that was when McCabe shot the ball in the bottom-right corner of the Birmingham goal, just out of reach of Hampton. The match finished 0–1, securing Champions League football for the first time in five years.

April
After the April international break, the Gunners returned to London Colney to prepare for the match against Everton at home on 21 April. Everton held the second-to-last spot in the league rankings and it was expected that the team would be able to brush them aside with relative ease. It turned out to be more difficult than expected, though the match started well with a goal from a corner in the fourth minute (scored either by Quinn or an own goal). Miedema followed suit, with a goal halfway through the first half. The second half saw a tackle on Mead, which was only punished with a yellow card by the referee. Arsenal players argued with the referee about this, with Van de Donk even shoving her - earning a yellow card as well. Both the cards could have been straight reds as well. Some time after this incident, Van Veenendaal was unlucky or distracted and picked up a backpass from Williamson earning the Toffees an indirect free kick which went into the back of the net. It made for an anxious last half hour of the game, but the Gunners were able to see the game out: ending it with a 2–1 win.

The stage was set for a possible title-winning game when Arsenal went to Brighton & Hove Albion on 28 April. After other European clubs had record attendances in their matches, Brighton moved the match to the Falmer Stadium in an attempt to boost the match attendance. The match set a new WSL record with 5,265 spectators, some way away from attendances in Europe but still a significant increase and a possible step up towards the future. Arsenal quickly got out of the blocks with Miedema scoring a great goal from range in the sixth minute, setting the scene of the match that was to follow. The Brighton goalkeeper was able to tip Miedema's shot to the crossbar, but it went back down into the goal. Miedema turned to provider to give a great through-ball to McCabe who slotted home the second goal after half an hour. The second half would see two further strikes: after 70 minutes, a great strike from distance by Mead leaving the keeper with no chance of saving it. A further six minutes later, Van de Donk scored the fourth goal ending the score with 0–4. This meant Arsenal could not be passed in the league table anymore by second-placed Manchester City, making the Gunners the 2018-19 Women's Super League champions after a seven-year wait since their last league title.

May
The only game left for the Gunners was on 11 May against runners-up Manchester City, who visited Arsenal at Meadow Park. The game didn't have any significance to the league standings, as both teams had already qualified for the Champions League and Arsenal could not be passed for first place anymore. City could've gone the whole season unbeaten domestically, had it not been for an 88th-minute strike by Mitchell fired in from outside the area past several City players and goalkeeper Ellie Roebuck. The defender had to deal with her share of injuries during the season and had only returned from injury this last game of the season.

Squad statistics
Last updated on 14 May 2019

Appearances and goals

Italic indicates an academy player.

Goalscorers

Disciplinary record

Clean sheets

Transfers, loans and other signings

Transfers in

Transfers out

Contract extensions

Current injuries

Non-competitive

Pre-season

Friendly

Competitions

Women's Super League

Matches

League table

Results summary

Results by matchday

FA Cup

WSL Cup

Group stage 
Group 2 South

Knockout rounds

Personal Awards

Professional Footballers' Association Players' Player of the Year 
 Vivianne Miedema

Professional Footballers' Association Team of the Year
 Lia Wälti
 Kim Little
 Vivianne Miedema

London Football Awards Player of the Year 
 Vivianne Miedema

Football Supporters' Federation Player of the Year 
 Beth Mead

League Managers Association Manager of the Year
 Joe Montemurro

Monthly awards

FA Women's Super League Player of the Month
 Beth Mead, April 2019 
 Beth Mead, March 2019 
 Daniëlle van de Donk, November 2018 
 Vivianne Miedema, October 2018

Professional Footballers' Association Fans' Player of the Month
 Jordan Nobbs, October 2018

League Managers Association Manager of the Month
 Joe Montemurro, March 2019 
 Joe Montemurro, October 2018

References

External links
 Official website
 Profile on UEFA.com

Arsenal W.F.C. seasons
Arsenal